is a Japanese football player who plays for Zweigen Kanazawa. He played for Japan national team.

Club career
After graduating from Seiryo High School, Toyoda joined Nagoya Grampus Eight. He made his first league appearance on August 21, 2004 against Júbilo Iwata. His first league goal came on July 23, 2005 against Kashima Antlers. He played for J2 League side Montedio Yamagata in 2007 and 2008 on a loan deal. After helping Yamagata to promote to J1 League, Toyoda made a permanent move to fellow J1 League side Kyoto Sanga FC in December 2008.

Toyoda went on loan to Ulsan Hyundai FC for the 2018 K League 1 season but his loan was terminated less than halfway through the season as he struggled to make an impact for his new team. He made 9 appearances scoring just 2 goals in Ulsan.

Toyoda loan again to Tochigi SC for the during 2021 J2 League mid season but his loan was terminated less than end through the season as he struggled to make an impact for his new team. He made 16 appearances scoring just 3 goals in Tochigi.

On 24 December 2021, Toyoda announcement officially transfer to J2 club, Zweigen Kanazawa for upcoming 2022 season.

National team career
Toyoda was a member of the Japan U-23 national team for the 2008 Summer Olympics finals. He scored a goal in a group stage match against Nigeria.

Career statistics

Club
.

National team statistics

Honours

Japan
EAFF East Asian Cup (1) : 2013

Individual
J2 League Top Scorer (1) : 2011
J.League Best XI (1) : 2012

References

External links

 
 Japan National Football Team Database
 
 
 
 Profile at Sagan Tosu

1985 births
Living people
Association football people from Ishikawa Prefecture
Japanese footballers
Japan international footballers
J1 League players
J2 League players
Nagoya Grampus players
Montedio Yamagata players
Kyoto Sanga FC players
Sagan Tosu players
Ulsan Hyundai FC players
Tochigi SC players
Zweigen Kanazawa players
Japanese expatriate sportspeople in South Korea
Olympic footballers of Japan
Footballers at the 2008 Summer Olympics
2015 AFC Asian Cup players
Association football forwards